Yekaterina Glushkova  (née Gariyeva, born 11 June 1981) is a former female water polo player of Kazakhstan. 

She was part of the Kazakhstani team at the  2013 World Aquatics Championships in Barcelona, Spain.

See also
 Kazakhstan at the 2013 World Aquatics Championships

References

External links

Kazakhstani female water polo players
Living people
Place of birth missing (living people)
1981 births
Water polo players at the 2004 Summer Olympics
Olympic water polo players of Kazakhstan
Asian Games medalists in water polo
Water polo players at the 2010 Asian Games
Asian Games silver medalists for Kazakhstan
Medalists at the 2010 Asian Games
21st-century Kazakhstani women